Hockey Roller Club Monza is a roller hockey team from Monza, Italy. It was founded in 2007 as Hockey Monza e Brianza. Nowadays plays in the Lega Nazionale Hockey (Serie A1), the most important division in Italy.

Honours

National

International

External links
Official website

Roller hockey clubs in Italy
Sport in Lombardy
Province of Monza and Brianza